Igor Stanisavljević (born 3 August 1978) is a Serbian football defender.

Born in Split, SR Croatia, after playing in the youth team of HNK Hajduk Split he moved in 1993 to FR Yugoslavia and made his debut as senior with FK Budućnost Podgorica.  During the following 15 years he would play for numerous Serbian top league clubs, such as FK Borac Čačak, FK Sloboda Užice, FK Železnik, FK Radnički Beograd and FK Kom.

References

External links
 

1978 births
Living people
Footballers from Split, Croatia
Serbs of Croatia
Serbian footballers
Association football defenders
FK Budućnost Podgorica players
FK Borac Čačak players
FK Sloboda Užice players
FK Železnik players
FK Radnički Beograd players
FK Kom players
OFK Mladenovac players
FK Inđija players
FK Sevojno players